Beti may refer to:

People 
 Mongo Beti (1932–2001), Cameroonian writer
 Beti George (born 1939), Welsh television and radio broadcaster
 Beti Jones (1919–2006), Scottish social worker
 Beti Kamya-Turwomwe (born 1955), Ugandan businesswoman and politician
 Beti Rimac (born 1976), Croatian volleyball player
 Beti Rhys (1907–2003), Welsh bookstore owner and author
 Beti Sekulovski (born 1983), Australian tennis player

Other uses 
 Béti, a sub-prefecture of Logone Occidental Region in Chad
 Beti people, a Central African ethnic group
 Beti language, a group of Bantu languages in Central and West Africa
 Beti language (Côte d'Ivoire) or Eotile, a nearly extinct Tano language
 Beti (1969 film), an Indian, Hindi-language film
 Beti (TV series), a 2018 Pakistani TV show

See also 
 Betti (disambiguation)

Language and nationality disambiguation pages